Acrocercops unilineata is a moth of the family Gracillariidae. It is known from Queensland, Australia.

References

unilineata
Moths of Australia
Moths described in 1894